The Wisconsin Windigo are a Tier II junior ice hockey team in the North American Hockey League's Midwest Division.  Based in Eagle River, Wisconsin, the Windigo play their home games at Eagle River Stadium, affectitionately referred to as the "Dome".

History
The franchise was previously known as the New Mexico Mustangs, a team which began in 2010 and played at the Santa Ana Star Center in Rio Rancho, New Mexico. After two seasons, both seeing them finishing in last place in the South Division, the Mustangs announced on May 23, 2012, that they had been granted inactive status and would not compete in the upcoming season.

On December 21, it was announced that the Mustangs' franchise had been acquired by the Minnesota Junior Hockey Group and would relocate to Richfield for the 2013–14 season.  The Magicians' name, logo and colors were announced on January 21, 2013.

In March 2014, the team completed its inaugural season of play with 50 points, averaging nearly 700 fans per game. For the 2016–17 season, the league moved the Magicians back to the Midwest Division after one year in the Central.

The Magicians captured their first division championship in 2021 to earn a spot in the Robertson Cup semifinals. The team began their playoff run with a sweep of second place Fairbanks followed by a five-game series victory over Kenai River.

The team announced in March 2022 that it had been sold to Copper Island Hockey Club, LLC and would relocate to Eagle River, Wisconsin for the 2022–23 season. On May 3, the team was announced as the Wisconsin Windigo.

Season-by-season records

Coaches and staff
As of May 2021
Head coach/GM: Nick Bydal
Assistant coaches: Jake Hansen
Owners: Ron Beran, Scott Krueger, Joe Pankratz
Vice President: Kevin Ingvalson
Former owners: Scott Meyer (2013–2018), A.J. Bucchino (2018–2021)

References

External links 
Official site
Official league site

North American Hockey League teams
Amateur ice hockey teams in Minnesota
Richfield, Minnesota
Sports in Minneapolis–Saint Paul
Ice hockey clubs established in 2013
2013 establishments in Minnesota